Below are the rosters for the 1977 FIFA World Youth Championship tournament in Tunisia. Those marked in bold went on to earn full international caps.

Group A

Head coach:  Jack Braun

Head coach:  Alfonso Portugal

Head coach:  Chus Pereda

Head coach: Moktar Ben Nacef

Group B

Head coach:  Rodolfo Trinidad Ramirez Godoy

Head coach: Gyula Rákosi

Head coach: Abdallah Ben Barek

Head coach:  Agustín Isarch

Group C

Head coach:  Evaristo de Macedo

Head coach:  George Beniamini

Head coach: Mahmoud Yavari

Head coach:  Italo Acconcia

Group D

Head coach:  Alfred Hohenberger

 Only 16 players in Austria squad.
(17) Karl Meister MF Lask Linz Austria 02/24/1958 (18) Johann Gross FW Rapid Wien Austria 12/21/1959

Head coach:  Nedrag Stanković

Head coach:  Salvador Breglia

Head coach:  Sergei Mosyagin

References

FIFA pages on the 1977 Youth World Cup

Fifa World Youth Championship Squads, 1977
FIFA U-20 World Cup squads